Perdonami! (i. e. "Forgive me!") is a 1953 Italian melodrama film written and directed by Mario Costa and starring Raf Vallone and  Antonella Lualdi.

Plot

Cast 

Raf Vallone as Marco Gerace
Antonella Lualdi as Anna Boetto 
Tamara Lees as  Vera 
Aldo Bufi Landi as  Nicola Boetto
 Patrizia Remiddi as  Carletta 
 Augusto Pennella as  Luigino 
Dante Maggio as Michele 
Emma Baron as  Maria Boetto 
 Celeste Almieri as Miss Parodi 
Zoe Incrocci as  Adele  
Carlo D'Angelo as Commissioner
Attilio Dottesio as Brigadiere
Alessandro Fersen as  Raul 
Rino Genovese as  Ernesto

References

External links

Perdonami at Variety Distribution

Italian drama films
1953 drama films
1953 films
Films directed by Mario Costa
Films scored by Carlo Rustichelli
Melodrama films
Italian black-and-white films
1950s Italian films